Gautier may refer to:

People 
  Gautier or Walter of Pontoise (c. 1030 – c. 1099), French saint
 Gautier le Leu, thirteenth-century French poet
 Gautier (surname)

Places
Gautier, Dominican Republic, a municipal district in the San Pedro de Macorís province
Gautier, Mississippi, a city in Jackson County, Mississippi, United States

Other uses
Gautier furniture, French furniture manufacturer  
Gautier-Languereau, French publishing house founded by Gautier and Maurice Languereau

See also
Gaultier (disambiguation)
Gauthier
Gotye (born 1980), Belgian-Australian musician, singer, songwriter
Vautier